Kelurahan Brebes is an administrative village and the capital of Kecamatan Brebes, it is bordered by Pasarbatang to the north, Gandasuli and Limbangan Kulon to the east, Pulosari and Padasugih to the south, and Pebatan and Pesantunan to the west.

References

Administrative villages in Central Java